This is a chronological list of pioneer aircraft built, planned or conceptualized before 1914. Entries here may or may not be repeated in the main List of aircraft pages.

Before the 19th Century

 12000 BC Vailixi flying machines
 12000 BC Vimanika flying machines
 400 BC Archytas steam powered pigeon
 1485 Da Vinci Ornithopter
 1493 Da Vinci Helicopter
 1495 Da Vinci Aeroplane
 1648 Hautsch and Burattini Flying machine
 1655 Borelli and Hooke Ornithopter
 1670 Terzi Flying boat
 1678 Besnier Ornithopter
 1709 De Gusmao Steam airship
 1714 Swedenborg Monoplane
 1742 De Bacqueville Artificial wings
 1754 Lomonosov Helicopter
 1764 Bauer Ornithopter
 1768 Paucton Helicopter
 1772 Desforges Flying machine
 1781 Blanchard Flying machine
 1781 Meerwein Ornithopter
 1784 Blanchard Airship
 1784 Charles and Robert Airship
 1784 Gerard Ornithopter
 1784 Launoy and Bienvenu Helicopter
 1784 Meusnier Airship
 1784 Renaux Ornithopter
 1784 Thibault Flying machine
 1788 De Goue Flying machine
 1793 Aguilera Glider
 1796 Cayley Helicopter

19th Century

 1804 Cayley Glider
 1808 Degen Ornithopter
 1811 Berblinger Glider
 1812 Leppig Airship
 1818 Lambertgye Helicopter
 1828 Sarti Helicopter
 1842 Henson Ariel monoplane
 1843 Cayley Helicopter
 1845 Cossus Helicopter
 1848 Cayley Biplane glider
 1848 Stringfellow Monoplane
 1849 Porter Airship
 1850 Jullien Airship
 1852 Giffard Airship
 1853 Cayley Glider
 1853 Letur Flying machine
 1854 Porter Airship
 1856 Mouillard Glider No.1
 1857 Du Temple Monoplane
 1857 Le Bris Albatross glider
 1857 Mouillard Glider No.2 and No.3 (1857–1864)
 1858 Wenham Multiwing glider
 1861 Amecourt Helicopter
 1861 Bright Helicopter
 1861 Nelson Helicopter
 1862 Crowell Helicopter
 1862 Powers Helicopter
 1863 Amecourt Helicopter
 1863 Andrews Aereon airship
 1864 Teleshov Mennon Struve Sistema Vosdukhoplavania monoplane
 1865 Brodbeck Airship
 1866 Andrews Aereon 2 airship
 1866 Wenham Monoplane and Multiwing glider
 1866 Wootton Helicopter
 1867 Teleshov Delta (rocket engined)
 1868 Le Bris Albatross II glider
 1868 Stringfellow Triplane
 1869 Marriott Avitor airship
 1870 Penaud Helicopter
 1871 Penaud Planophore
 1871 Pomes & Pauze Helicopter (rocket rotor engined)
 1871 Rykachev Helicopter
 1872 De Lome Airship
 1872 Haenlein Airship
 1872 Maxim Helicopter
 1873 Penaud Ornithopter
 1874 Achenbach Helicopter
 1874 Du Temple Monoplane
 1874 Penaud Amphibian monoplane
 1875 Moy Aerial Steamer
 1876 Penaud Monoplane with enclosed flight deck
 1876 Ward Helicopter
 1877 Dieuaide Helicopter
 1877 Forlanini Helicopter
 1877 Vuitton Helicopter
 1878 Castel Helicopter
 1878 Mouillard Glider No.4 (1878–1895)
 1878 Ritchel Airship
 1879 Biot-Massia Glider
 1879 Greenough Helicopter
 1879 Melikoff Helicopter
 1879 Quinby Helicopter
 1879 Stedman Airship
 1879 Tatin Monoplane
 1880 Wolfert Baumgarten Airship
 1883 Tissandier Airship
 1884 Goupil Duck
 1884 Montgomery glider#1 (Gull)
 1884 Mozhaisky Monoplane
 1884 Renard Krebs Airship
 1885 Montgomery glider#2
 1885 Wolf Airship
 1886 Montgomery glider#3
 1887 Langley Glider
 1888 Herard Flying machine
 1888 Johnston Helicopter
 1888 Wolfert Airship
 1889 Hargrave Flying machine
 1890 Ader Eole
 1890 Tatin and Richet Flying machine (1890–1897)
 1891 Capazza Airship
 1891 Hargrave Monoplane
 1891 Lilienthal Derwitzer glider
 1891 Matyunin Mikst airship (mixed HTA-LTA I. A. Matyunin)
 1891 Ninomiya Karasu and Tamamushi
 1892 Ader Avion II
 1892 Lilienthal Sudende glider
 1892 Ostoja-Ostaszweski-Mondrzykowski Stibor No.1
 1893 Herring Glider
 1893 Lilienthal Klein ornithopter (1893–1896)
 1893 Lilienthal Maihohe Rhinow glider
 1893 Phillips 1893 Multi-Wing Flying machine
 1893 Schwartz Airship
 1894 Herring Monoplane glider
 1894 Lanchester Aerodon
 1894 Lilienthal Normalsegelapparat glider
 1894 Lilienthal Sturmflugel glider
 1894 Maxim Flying machine
 1894 Tanski Glider
 1895 Lilienthal Gross doppeldecker glider
 1895 Lilienthal Klein doppeldecker glider
 1895 Lilienthal Vorflugelapparat glider
 1895 Pilcher Beetle, Bat and Gull glider
 1895 Talpade Marutsakha flying machine
 1896 Chanute Biplane and Multiwing glider
 1896 Frost Airship Glider
 1896 Langley Aerodrome No.5 and No.6
 1896 Lilienthal Gross ornithopter
 1897 Ader Avion III
 1897 Gallaudet Hydroplane glider
 1897 Nyberg Flugan (1897–1910)
 1897 Pilcher Hawk glider
 1897 Schwartz and Berg Airship
 1898 Gilmore Monoplane
 1898 Herring Biplane motorglider
 1898 Santos-Dumont No.1 airship
 1899 Pilcher Triplane motorglider
 1899 Santos-Dumont No.2 airship
 1899 Santos-Dumont No.3 airship
 1899 Whitehead Flying machine (Gustav Whitehead Weisskops)

1900

 1900 Santos-Dumont No.4 airship
 1900 Wright No.1 Glider
 1900 Zeppelin LZ-1 airship

1901

 1901 Blériot I
 1901 Kress Floatplane
 1901 Nemethy Flugrad (Emil von Némethy)
 1901 Santos-Dumont No.5 airship
 1901 Santos-Dumont No.6 airship
 1901 Whitehead No. 21 (Gustav Whitehead Weisskops)
 1901 Wright No.2 Glider

1902

 1902 Cannon Ezekiel Airship
 1902 Ferber Biplane glider (Ferdinand Ferber)
 1902 Lebaudy No.1 airship
 1902 Santos-Dumont No.7 airship
 1902 Spencer Airship No.1
 1902 Wright No.3 glider

1903

 1903 Botts Flying machine
 1903 Fedorov Five wing plane
 1903 Jatho Doppeldecker motorgleiter
 1903 Langley Aerodrome A
 1903 Lebaudy No.1 Jaune I bis airship
 1903 Pearse monoplane
 1903 Santos-Dumont No.9 Baladeuse airship
 1903 Santos-Dumont No.10 airship
 1903 Spencer Airship No.2
 1903 Tatin Mallet Airship
 1903 Wright Flyer l

1904

 1904 Archdeacon Glider
 1904 Lebaudy No.1A airship
 1904 Montgomery Santa Clara tandem glider
 1904 Phillips 1904 Multi-Wing Flying machine
 1904 Wright Flyer II

1905

 1905 Blériot II
 1905 Blériot-Voisin Floatplane glider
 1905 Ellehammer Monoplane
 1905 Ferber VI glider
 1905 Gillespie Aeroplane
 1905 Jones Aeroplane (Charles Oliver Jones)
 1905 Lebaudy No.1B airship
 1905 Lipkovski Helicopter
 1905 Montgomery California tandem glider
 1905 Montgomery Defalco tandem glider
 1905 Santos-Dumont No.11 monoplane
 1905 Santos-Dumont No.12 helicopter
 1905 Santos-Dumont No.13 airship
 1905 Schio Italia I airship
 1905 Voisin Floatplane glider
 1905 Willows No.1 airship
 1905 Wright Flyer III

1906

 1906 Blériot III tandem biplane
 1906 Blériot IV tandem biplane
 1906 Bellamy Floatplane
 1906 Crocco and Ricaldoni Airship 1
 1906 De La Hault Ornithopter (flapper)
 1906 Ellehammer No.1 tractor monoplane  
 1906 Ellehammer semi-biplane
 1906 Gilbert Monoplane (Eugene Gilbert)
 1906 Godard Airship (French airship built for an American journalist to reach the North Pole)
 1906 Lebaudy No.1C airship
 1906 Lebaudy No.2 Patrie airship
 1906 Parseval Versuchsluftschiff
 1906 Pischoff et Koechlin Tandem biplane
 1906 Santos-Dumont No.14A airship
 1906 Santos-Dumont No.14B airship
 1906 Santos-Dumont No.14bis Canard
 1906 Surcouf Airship
 1906 Vuia I
 1906 Vuia I bis
 1906 Zeppelin LZ-2 airship
 1906 Zeppelin LZ-3 Z-I airship
 1906 Zodiac No.1 airship

1907

 1907 ABF No.1 NS I and NS II airship (also known as British Army Airship No.1 NS I and NS II)
 1907 Agusta Biplane (Giovanni Agusta)
 1907 Blanc and Barlatier Aeroplane
 1907 Blériot V Canard
 1907 Blériot VI Libellule
 1907 Blériot VII monoplane
 1907 Breguet-Richet Gyroplane No.1
 1907 Collomb Ornithopter
 1907 Cornu helicopter
 1907 De La Vaux Monoplane
 1907 De Pischoff Tractor biplane
 1907 Dunne D.1 glider
 1907 Ellehammer Triplane
 1907 Equivelly-Montjustin Multiplane
 1907 Epps Monoplane
 1907 Esnault-Pelterie REP.1
 1907 Etrich-Wels I
 1907 Farman HF.I pusher biplane (Henri Farman)
 1907 Ferber VIII
 1907 Gammeter Orthopter
 1907 Gross-Basenach Versuchsluftschiff
 1907 Koechlin No.1 biplane
 1907 Lebaudy No.2A airship
 1907 Phillips 1907 Multi-Wing Flying machine
 1907 Santos-Dumont No.15 biplane
 1907 Santos-Dumont No.16 airship
 1907 Santos-Dumont No.19 Demoiselle
 1907 Santos-Dumont No.19bis Demoiselle
 1907 Sautereau Biplane
 1907 Seux Monoplane (Edmond Seux)
 1907 Torres-Quevedo No.1 airship
 1907 Voisin 1907 biplane
 1907 Voisin HF.I biplane
 1907 Vuia II
 1907 Wright Model A

1908

 1908 AEA June Bug
 1908 AEA Loon pontoon floatplane
 1908 AEA Red Wing
 1908 AEA Silver Dart
 1908 AEA White Wing
 1908 Antoinette IV
 1908 Antoinette V
 1908 Astra-Clement-Bayard No.1 airship
 1908 Astra-Kapferer Tandem plane
 1908 Auffin-Ordt Monoplane
 1908 Baldwin SC-1 airship
 1908 Bates Biplane I
 1908 Bates Biplane II
 1908 Berliner-Williams Helicopter
 1908 Bertin Compound helicopter
 1908 Blanc et Barlatier Monoplane
 1908 Blériot VIII monoplane
 1908 Blériot IX monoplane
 1908 Blériot X biplane
 1908 Blériot XI monoplane
 1908 Bocker Triplane
 1908 Bonnet-Labranche No.1 pusher biplane
 1908 Bonnet-Labranche No.2 pusher biplane
 1908 Bousson Borguis Triplane
 1908 Breguet-Richet Gyroplane No.2
 1908 Cody I biplane (also known as British Army Aeroplane No.1 of Cody 'Cathedral')
 1908 De Caters Triplane
 1908 Delagrange No.2 biplane
 1908 Delagrange No.3 biplane
 1908 Dernaut Monoplane
 1908 Denhaut-Bouyer-Mercier Biplane
 1908 Dufaux Tractor dreidecker
 1908 Dunne D.4
 1908 Ellehammer IV tractor biplane
 1908 Esnault-Pelterie REP 2 monoplane
 1908 Etrich-Wels Tailless parasol
 1908 Etrich-Wels Tractor monoplane
 1908 Euler No.3 doppeldecker
 1908 Farman HF.Ibis pusher triplane (Henri Farman)
 1908 Farman HF Flying fish monoplane
 1908 Ferber IX (also known as Antoinette III)
 1908 Gasnier Biplane (René Gasnier)
 1908 Gastambide-Mengin I (also known as Antoinette I)
 1908 Gastambide-Mengin II (also known as Antoinette II)
 1908 Geisler Eindecker
 1908 Goupy Triplane
 1908 Grade Dreidecker
 1908 Gross-Basenach M I airship
 1908 Guilbaut Tandem monoplane
 1908 Guyot et Verdier Biplane
 1908 Hippsich Eindecker (maybe 1908)
 1908 Italian Μilitary Αirship No.1
 1908 Jatho IV doppeldecker motorgleiter
 1908 Kapferer Tandem monoplane
 1908 Lebaudy No.3 Republique airship
 1908 Leray Triplane
 1908 Liore No.1
 1908 Lorenzen Helicopter
 1908 Luyties Otto Helicopter
 1908 Ostoja-Ostaszweski Stibor No.2 ornithopter
 1908 Ostoja-Ostaszweski Stibor No.3 ornithopter
 1908 Passat Ornithopter
 1908 Pean Monoplane
 1908 Pischoff et Koechlin Tandem monoplane
 1908 Quick Monoplane
 1908 Robart 1 1.2 monoplane
 1908 Robinson Monoplane
 1908 Roe I Biplane
 1908 Roshon Multiplane
 1908 Santos-Dumont No.20 Demoiselle
 1908 Schneider No.1 biplane (Frederick Schneider)
 1908 Scholtz Flying machine
 1908 Sellers No.5 quadriplane
 1908 Seux-Roesch Biplane
 1908 Shabsky Uchebny airship
 1908 Torres-Quevedo No.2 airship
 1908 Tatin Monoplane
 1908 Tips Canard biplane
 1908 Vaniman Triplane
 1908 Vendome No.2 monoplane
 1908 Voisin HF.Ibis biplane
 1908 Voisin Standard biplane
 1908 Vuitton-Huber Helicopter
 1908 Williams Quadriplane
 1908 Witzig-Liore-Dutilleul Biplane
 1908 Zens Pusher biplane
 1908 Zeppelin LZ-4.2 airship
 1908 Zeppelin LZ-4.3 airship
 1908 Zerbe Sextuplane (James Slough Zerbe)

1909

 1909 ABF No.2A airship (also known as British Army Airship No.2A)
 1909 ABF No.3 airship (also known as British Army Airship No.3)
 1909 Abric-Calas Glider
 1909 Abric-Calas Biplane
 1909 Aerial Manufacturing monoplane
 1909 Aerocar Monoplane
 1909 Aeromarine Flying boat
 1909 Aimé-Salmson Autoplane
 1909 Aldasoro Monoplane
 1909 AMA Biplane
 1909 Antoinette VI
 1909 Antoinette VII
 1909 Antoinette VIII
 1909 Antoni Monoplane
 1909 Anzani Tractor monoplane
 1909 Armitage Monoplane 1 seater
 1909 Arnoux Flying wing
 1909 ASL monoplane No.1
 1909 Astley Monoplane
 1909 Auffin-Ordt Monoplane
 1909 A.V.I.A. Monoplane
 1909 A.V.I.A. Vedette biplane
 1909 Avioplan
 1909 Baddeck No. 1
 1909 Baddeck No. 2
 1909 Barnwell Canard biplane
 1909 Barillon Monoplane No.1
 1909 Barrillon Monoplane No.2
 1909 Beach-Willard Monoplane
 1909 Beilharz Eindecker
 1909 Blackburn Dart triplane
 1909 Blackburn-Walker biplane
 1909 Blériot XII highwing monoplane
 1909 Bobenreith Biplane
 1909 Bokor Triplane
 1909 Bonnet-Labranche ABL monoplane
 1909 Bonnet-Labranche No.3 pusher biplane
 1909 Borgnis Tailless pusher triplane
 1909 Boutaric Triplane
 1909 Bradshaw Monoplane
 1909 Brauner and Smith Biplane
 1909 Breguet I tractor biplane
 1909 Breguet II tractor biplane
 1909 Britain Triplane
 1909 BRT Biplane
 1909 Brunet-Olivert Biplane
 1909 Bulot Triplane (Belgian Walther Bulot)
 1909 Burchard Triplane 
 1909 Burlingame Monoplane
 1909 Canton et Unne Push-pull triplane
 1909 Caproni Ca.1 (1910)
 1909 Caudron A tractor biplane
 1909 Cazalot et Prevot Biplane
 1909 Chapiro Biplane
 1909 Chaussee Biplane
 1909 Chauviere No.1 monoplane
 1909 Chauviere No.2 biplane
 1909 Chedeville Monoplane
 1909 Christmas Red Bird I biplane
 1909 Clement M monoplane
 1909 Clerget Monoplane
 1909 Cluzan Biplane
 1909 Cobianchi Brescia Biplane
 1909 Cobioni Monoplane
 1909 Copin Tractor biplane
 1909 Cremp Monoplane
 1909 Crocco and Ricaldoni P1 airship
 1909 Curtiss Golden Flyer
 1909 Curtiss Reims Racer
 1909 Cuthbertson I and II pusher biplane
 1909 Daimler Lutskoy No.1 monoplane
 1909 De Feure-Deperdussin Monoplane
 1909 De Havilland Biplane No. 1
 1909 De Laminne Biplane (Chevalier Louis de Laminne)
 1909 De Silva Biplane
 1909 Du Reau Monoplane
 1909 Dufaux 4 doppeldecker
 1909 Dufaux Tiltrotor
 1909 Dufaux Tractor doppeldecker
 1909 Ellehammer Standard monoplane
 1909 Eparvier Monoplane
 1909 Epps Monoplane
 1909 Etrich Nurflugel tractor monoplane
 1909 Etrich Taube tractor monoplane
 1909 Etrich-Wels Praterspatz tractor monoplane 
 1909 Euler Pusher doppeldecker 1 seater
 1909 Euler-Voisin Pusher biplane
 1909 Faccioli No.2 triplane
 1909 Faccioli No.3 biplane
 1909 Faludy III biplane
 1909 Farman HF.II tractor biplane
 1909 Farman HF.III pusher biplane
 1909 Farman HF.IV pusher biplane
 1909 Farman MF.I pusher biplane (Maurice Farman)
 1909 Farman-Sommer Biplane
 1909 Faure Monoplane
 1909 Ferguson Tractor monoplane
 1909 Fernandez No.2 biplane
 1909 Fernandez No.3 Aeral biplane
 1909 Ford-Van Auken mono tractor plane
 1909 Forlanini F.1 Da Vinci airship
 1909 Gakkel I
 1909 Gebauer Airplane
 1909 Germe Biplane
 1909 Gilbert Monoplane
 1909 Gilly Triplane
 1909 Givaudan Aerofoil multicellplane
 1909 Godard Goldschmidt Airship
 1909 Goupy I triplane
 1909 Goupy II biplane
 1909 Grade Eindecker
 1909 Grandjean Eindecker
 1909 Greene Biplane
 1909 Gregoire Monoplane 1
 1909 Grose & Feary Monoplane
 1909 Gross-Basenach M II airship
 1909 Gross-Basenach M III airship
 1909 Guyot-Cellier Tandem biplane
 1909 Hammond Biplane
 1909 Handley Page Glider
 1909 Hanriot 1909 monoplane
 1909 Heath Monoplane
 1909 Hespel Monoplane
 1909 Hieronymus I
 1909 Howard Wright 1909 Biplane
 1909 Howard Wright 1909 Barber monoplane
 1909 Howard Wright 1909 Cooke monoplane
 1909 Howard Wright 1909 monoplane
 1909 Howard Wright 1909 Lascelles Ornis
 1909 Humphreys Biplane
 1909 IAL Monoplane
 1909 Italian Μilitary Αirship No.1bis
 1909 Kaspar-Cihak Monoplane
 1909 Kluytman Twin pusher biplane
 1909 Koechlin A monoplane
 1909 Kremp Yu Monoplane
 1909 La Belgique Airship
 1909 La Flandre Airship (Henri Farman)
 1909 Lambert Airship (Henri Farman)
 1909 Lamine Biplane
 1909 Lamoureux Monoplane
 1909 Lasternas Biplane
 1909 Lebaudy No.4 airship
 1909 Lebaudy No.5 Liberte airship
 1909 Le Prieur-Aihara Glider
 1909 Legagnoux Biplane
 1909 Legras Biplane
 1909 Lejeune Biplane
 1909 Lejeune Modified biplane
 1909 Lepin Triplane
 1909 Lepousse Aerotorpille
 1909 Letord et Niepce Monoplane
 1909 Ling Monoplane
 1909 Liwentaal Libellule tandem biplane
 1909 Loose Monoplane
 1909 Lutskoy I rotary wing apparatus
 1909 Macfie monoplane
 1909 Marchand Monoplane (Henri Farman)
 1909 Marchetti Chimera biplane
 1909 Martin Pusher biplane
 1909 Martinet Biplane
 1909 Maxfield Monoplane
 1909 Mazoyer Monoplane
 1909 McDowell Monoplane
 1909 Mercep Biplane
 1909 Miller Monoplane
 1909 Moisant L'Ecrevisse Monoplane
 1909 Moore-Brabazon
 1909 Moreau Aerostable monoplane
 1909 Neale Monoplane
 1909 Nemethy Eindecker 
 1909 Nieuport Monoplane
 1909 Obre Biplane
 1909 Obre Biplane No.2
 1909 Page-Light Biplane
 1909 Parseval Aeroboat
 1909 Parseval PL-1 airship
 1909 Parseval PL-2 P-I airship
 1909 Parseval PL-3 P-II airship
 1909 Paulhan biplane
 1909 Pischoff et Koechlin Monoplane
 1909 Pischoff-Koechlin-Piquerez Biplane
 1909 Platel Monoplane
 1909 Ponzelli-Miller Aerocurvo monoplane
 1909 Pride Monoplane
 1909 Prosper Monoplane
 1909 Raiche-Crout Biplane
 1909 Rickman Helicopter (bicycle aircraft)
 1909 Roe I Triplane
 1909 Rossel-Peugeot Biplane
 1909 Rumpler Taube
 1909 Rusjan EDA I biplane
 1909 Rusjan EDA II
 1909 Rusjan EDA III
 1909 Saint Marcq Airship
 1909 Salamanca Biplane
 1909 Sanchis Biplane
 1909 Sanders No.1 biplane
 1909 Santos-Dumont No.21 Demoiselle
 1909 Santos-Dumont No.22 Demoiselle
 1909 Saul No.1 tandem biplane
 1909 Savary Tractor biplane
 1909 SCAA Fregates Monoplane
 1909 Scottish Aeroplane Syndicate Avis (Howard T. Wright designer W.O. Manning)
 1909 SELA 1 monoplane
 1909 Sellers No.6 quadriplane
 1909 Short Biplane No.1
 1909 Short Biplane No.2
 1909 Siemens-Bourcart Doppeldecker
 1909 Sikorsky S-1 helicopter
 1909 Soltau Sturmvogel ornithopter
 1909 Sorokin Helicopter
 1909 Stebbins-Geynet Pusher triplane
 1909 Stoeckel Monoplane
 1909 Stolfa Aeroplane 
 1909 Svachulay Hummingbird I
 1909 Sverchkov Cyclogyro
 1909 Tanski Latka monoplane
 1909 Tatarinov Aeromobile
 1909 Tips Pusher biplane
 1909 Tucek I 1 seater monoplane
 1909 Tupolev Glider
 1909 UFA Monoplane
 1909 UFA Triplane
 1909 Ueda Hiryu-Go Biplane
 1909 Usuelli U.1 airship (non-rigid airship designed by Celestino Usuelli)
 1909 Vandenbergh Flapper (ornithopter like)
 1909 Vasserot Glider
 1909 Vendome La Moustique monoplane
 1909 Vendome No.3 monoplane
 1909 Vendome No.3bis monoplane
 1909 Verdaguer Biplane
 1909 Vernander APV
 1909 Vlemincckz Biplane
 1909 Voisin Bird of Passage pusher biplane
 1909 Voisin Tractor biplane
 1909 Vosgiens Biplane
 1909 Vreedenburgh Monoplane
 1909 Walden No.3 monoplane
 1909 Walden Tandem biplane
 1909 Watkins Monoplane
 1909 Weiss Flying wing glider
 1909 Willows No.2 airship
 1909 Windham Monoplane No.1
 1909 WLD No.2 biplane
 1909 Wright Military Flyer
 1909 Wright Model A transitional
 1909 Zalewski WZ-I
 1909 Zeppelin LZ-5 Z-II airship
 1909 Zeppelin LZ-6 airship
 1909 Zipfel Biplane
 1909 Zipfel Triplane
 1909 Zodiac No.2 airship
 1909 Zodiac No.3 airship
 1909 Zodiac No.4 airship
 1909 Zolyi Biplane (Adalar Zolyi also known as Zoelgi)
 1909 Zornes Biplane (Charles A. Zornes)

1910

 1910 Abberly Biplane
 1910 ABF Beta I and Beta II airship (also known as British Army Airship Beta I and Beta II)
 1910 ABF Gamma I and Gamma II airship (also known as British Army Airship Gamma I and Gamma II)
 1910 Adorjan Libelle monoplane
 1910 Adorjan Strucc monoplane
 1910 AEG Z1 doppeldecker
 1910 Aeromarine 8 pusher canard
 1910 Agapov Farman Sommer Biplane
 1910 Ago Doppeldecker
 1910 Agusta Glider
 1910 Albatros Biplane
 1910 Albert Monoplane (Jean Albert)
 1910 Albessard Tandem monoplane (La Balancelle)
 1910 Alexander Monoplane
 1910 Alfaro ACA glider
 1910 Alkan Le Enfin (Oscar Alkan)
 1910 Andrews Pusher biplane
 1910 Angelis Biplane
 1910 Antonov Helicoplane
 1910 Armitage Monoplane 2 seater
 1910 Armstrong Monoplane
 1910 Ask-Nyrop 1 Grasshoppan monoplane
 1910 ASL monoplane No.2
 1910 ASL Valkyrie A, B and C
 1910 Astra-Wright Biplane
 1910 Astra-Wright E biplane
 1910 Aubry Meteor monoplane
 1910 Audineau Monoplane
 1910 Auffin-Ordt Monoplane
 1910 Aventino-Mingozi-Paletta Monoplane
 1910 A.V.I.A. Biplane
 1910 Aviatik Doppeldecker
 1910 Aviator Monoplane
 1910 Baden-Powell Monoplane
 1910 Baldwin Red Devil biplane
 1910 Bell Mike Monoplane
 1910 Benegent Monoplane
 1910 Bertin Monoplane
 1910 Bertrand Ducted-propeller monoplane
 1910 Bilek Monoplane
 1910 Black Diamond pusher biplane
 1910 Bland Mayfly
 1910 Blériot XI Circuit de l'Est
 1910 Blériot XIII
 1910 Blériot XIV
 1910 Bloudek-Potucek-Cermak Racek monoplane
 1910 BMFW Stahleindecker
 1910 Bokor II biplane
 1910 Bonnet-Labrance No.6 School
 1910 Bonnet-Labrance No.7 Racer
 1910 Borel Pusher monoplane
 1910 Bothy Monoplane
 1910 Bourdariat Biplane
 1910 Bracke Monoplane
 1910 Breguet III tractor biplane
 1910 Bristol Boxkite
 1910 Brooks Biplane
 1910 Brunet Tandem biplane
 1910 Brzeski Aquila monoplane
 1910 Bueno et Demaurex Pusher biplane
 1910 Burgess A pusher biplane
 1910 Burgess B pusher biplane
 1910 Burgess D pusher biplane
 1910 Bylinkin Iordan Sikorsky BIS No.1 biplane
 1910 Bylinkin Iordan Sikorsky BIS No.2 biplane
 1910 Bylinkin Monoplane
 1910 Canadian Aerodrome Co. Hubbard II Mike
 1910 Canton et Unne Push-pull monoplane
 1910 Caproni Ca.2 (1910)
 1910 Caproni Ca.3 (1910)
 1910 Carid Monoplane
 1910 Caudron A2-6 tractor biplane
 1910 Caux et Camboulive Biplane
 1910 Cerny Monoplane
 1910 Chapiro Biplane No.2
 1910 Chassany Monoplane
 1910 Chesnay Monoplane
 1910 Christie Monoplane
 1910 Cihak C monoplane
 1910 Clement-Bayard No.2 airship
 1910 Clement M Pusher biplane
 1910 Clerget Monoplane
 1910 Clerget-Etrich Taube (Gustave Aman)
 1910 Clouth Airship
 1910 Coanda jet biplane (jet engined)
 1910 Cody Michelin Cup Biplane
 1910 Collier Monoplane
 1910 Collyer-Lang Otasel monoplane
 1910 Contal No.2 monoplane
 1910 Contal Tractor monoplane
 1910 Cordner Monoplane No.1
 1910 Courrejou Tractor monoplane
 1910 Crocco and Ricaldoni P2 airship
 1910 Culver Biplane
 1910 Curtiss Bennett Racer monoplane
 1910 Curtiss Ely monoplane
 1910 Curtiss Hudson Flyer biplane
 1910 Curtiss-Willard Banshee Express
 1910 Daily Old Glory Biplane
 1910 Daimler Lutskoy No.2 monoplane
 1910 Dajoigny et Beaussart Simplex monoplane
 1910 Danton Back staggered racing biplane
 1910 Day Tractor biplane
 1910 De Coster Flugi monoplane
 1910 De Feure-Deperdussin Canard
 1910 De Feure-Deperdussin No.2 monoplane
 1910 De Havilland Biplane No. 2
 1910 De La Hault Monoplane
 1910 De Lailhacar Monoplane
 1910 Denhaut Danton Biplane (Le Danton designed by Denhaut)
 1910 Deperdussin Canard monoplane
 1910 Deperdussin Type A monoplane
 1910 Desusclade Monoplane
 1910 Dokuchaev 1 biplane
 1910 Dorner II eindecker
 1910 Dottori Biplane 2 props
 1910 DSL Sao Paulo Monoplane (Dimitri Sensaud de Lavaud)
 1910 Dufour No.1 monoplane
 1910 Dufour No.2 biplane
 1910 Duigan pusher biplane
 1910 Dumas Monoplane
 1910 Dunne D.5
 1910 Dunne-Huntington triplane
 1910 Eaton-Twining Monoplane
 1910 Esnault-Pelterie REP B monoplane
 1910 Esnault-Pelterie REP D monoplane
 1910 Epps Monoplane
 1910 Escofet II Biplane
 1910 Etrich II modified Taube tractor monoplane
 1910 Etrich II Taube 2-seater tractor monoplane
 1910 Etrich III Möve (Seagull) tractor monoplane
 1910 Etrich IV Taube tractor monoplane
 1910 Etrich V Taube tractor monoplane
 1910 Etrich VI Taube tractor monoplane
 1910 Euler Military pusher doppeldecker
 1910 Everett-Edgecumbe Monoplane
 1910 Fabre Hydravion pusher canard
 1910 Faccioli No.4 biplane
 1910 Fairchild Monoplane
 1910 Farman Coupe Michelin Biplane
 1910 Farman Freres Biplane
 1910 Farman HF.II-2 parasol tractor monoplane
 1910 Farman HF.V
 1910 Ferguson No.2 monoplane
 1910 Fiedler Eindecker
 1910 Filiasi Biplane
 1910 Fokker I
 1910 Forssmann Airship
 1910 Fournier Monoplane
 1910 Francis Pusher biplane
 1910 Gakkel II
 1910 Gakkel III biplane
 1910 Gallone-Lampert Monoplane
 1910 Gambier Monoplane
 1910 Garnier Olga monoplane
 1910 Gasnier Biplane
 1910 Gates Biplane 
 1910 George & Jobling Biplane
 1910 Gibson No.2 biplane
 1910 Gibson No.3 biplane with twin tractor propellers
 1910 Gibson Twin plane
 1910 Goedecker No.1 eindecker
 1910 Gold Biplane (Willibald Gold)
 1910 Graf Napoli 1 monoplane
 1910 Greene 1910 Biplane
 1910 Gregoire Monoplane 2
 1910 Gregoire Monoplane 3
 1910 Grizodubov 1
 1910 Grizodubov 2
 1910 Grizodubov 3
 1910 Guillebaud Tandem monoplane
 1910 Guillemin Biplane
 1910 Gunn Biplane
 1910 Guyard Monoplane No.2
 1910 Hackel-RBWZ Biplane
 1910 Handley Page A Bluebird monoplane
 1910 Handley Page B
 1910 Hanriot Monoplane
 1910 Harroun Monoplane
 1910 Hartman monoplane
 1910 Heinrich A monoplane
 1910 Henry Canard monoplane
 1910 Herring-Burgess Flying fish biplane
 1910 Hornstein Biplane
 1910 Horvath 1B monoplane
 1910 Howard Wright 1910 Monoplane
 1910 Howard Wright 1910 Biplane
 1910 Howard Wright Avis monoplane
 1910 Howard Wright Demoiselle monoplane
 1910 Howard Wright Bleriot monoplane
 1910 Howard Wright Curtiss biplane
 1910 Howard Wright Ornis monoplane
 1910 Hudson-O'Brian Biplane
 1910 Hulbert Biplane
 1910 Humber Le Blon monoplane
 1910 Humber Lovelace 1 monoplane
 1910 Humber-Bleriot monoplane
 1910 Humber-Sommer biplane
 1910 Humber Tractor biplane
 1910 Illinschulz
 1910 Izhora No.1 Pigeon airship
 1910 Izhora No.2 Sokol airship
 1910 Izhora No.3 Albatros airship
 1910 Jacquelin Tractor biplane
 1910 JAP Harding Monoplane
 1910 Jeannin Doppeldecker
 1910 Jezzi No.1 pusher biplane
 1910 Jezzi No.1 tractor biplane
 1910 Jirotka Monoplane
 1910 Joachimczyk Monoplane
 1910 Jourdan Helioplane
 1910 Kalep
 1910 Karpeka 1 monoplane
 1910 Kasyanenko 1 and 1bis biplane
 1910 Kaufmann No.1 monoplane
 1910 Koechlin Monoplane
 1910 Kolbanyi I biplane
 1910 Kolousek Biplane
 1910 Kowalski Biplane
 1910 Kozlowski Biplane
 1910 Kudashev 1 biplane (Кудашев 1)
 1910 Kudashev 2 biplane
 1910 Kudashev 3 monoplane
 1910 Kvasz I monoplane
 1910 Lane No.1 monoplane
 1910 Lane Pusher biplane
 1910 Lange-Billard Triangular wing monoplane
 1910 Lanyi Biplane
 1910 Lascelles Ornis
 1910 Lebaudy No.5A airship
 1910 Lebaudy No.6 airship
 1910 Lebaudy No.7 airship
 1910 Lecoq-Monteiro-Aillaud Monoplane
 1910 Legnano I monoplane
 1910 Legrand Triplane
 1910 Lemaitre Biplane
 1910 Leroy et Marzollier Monoplane
 1910 Lesseps La frigate monoplane
 1910 Letai I biplane
 1910 Letord et Niepce Biplane
 1910 Libanski Jaskolka monoplane
 1910 Libanski Mono-Biplan I
 1910 Linon Monoplane (André Linon and Louis Linon)
 1910 Liore No.2 monoplane
 1910 Ljusik Monoplane
 1910 Lohner-Daimler Pfeilflieger I doppeldecker
 1910 Lohner-Umlauff Doppeldecker
 1910 Macchi-Nieuport Biplane
 1910 Macfie Empress biplane
 1910 Mainguet Tractor monoplane with enclosed flight deck
 1910 Mann & Overton Monoplane
 1910 Martin-Handasyde No.3
 1910 McCormick-James Monoplane
 1910 Meduna Monoplane
 1910 Mercep-Rusjan Monoplane
 1910 Michelet Biplane
 1910 Moisant Le Corbeau monoplane
 1910 Montgomery Tandem monoplane
 1910 Moon Moonbeam No.1 and No.2
 1910 Morel Canard 2 and 3 seater biplane
 1910 Mulliner Monoplane
 1910 Mullot Monoplane
 1910 Mullot Biplane
 1910 Myers Glider
 1910 Nau Monoplane
 1910 Neal VI monoplane
 1910 Neal VII biplane
 1910 Nicholson Monoplane
 1910 Nieuport II monoplane
 1910 Nieuport III 2 seater monoplane
 1910 Norman and Knight Monoplane
 1910 Nyrop No.3 monoplane
 1910 Obre No.3 monoplane
 1910 Ocenasek Monoplane 2 seater
 1910 Odier-Vendome Pusher biplane
 1910 Odier-Vendome Tractor biplane
 1910 Pachiotti Monoplane
 1910 Parent Monoplane
 1910 Parkes Monoplane
 1910 Parseval PL-6 airship
 1910 Parseval PL-7 airship
 1910 Parseval Seaplane
 1910 Passerat-Radiguet Monoplane
 1910 Paterson No.1 biplane
 1910 Paulhan biplane
 1910 Paumier Biplane
 1910 Pega Emich Sechsdecker
 1910 Penkala Leptir I biplane
 1910 Penkala Leptir II biplane
 1910 Pfitzner Monoplane
 1910 Picat-Dubreuit Monoplane
 1910 Piccoli Ausonia airship
 1910 Piggott Biplane
 1910 Pither Monoplane
 1910 Pivot Monoplane
 1910 Plage I biplane
 1910 Planes Biplane
 1910 Pliska Biplane
 1910 Poignard et Tranchard Monoplane
 1910 Pollock Monoplane
 1910 Porte Monoplane
 1910 Portway Monoplane
 1910 Poulain Orange No.1 biplane
 1910 Poynter Monoplane
 1910 Prazma Biplane
 1910 Pulpe
 1910 Ragot Canard monoplane
 1910 Raiche Biplane
 1910 Rajki Monoplane
 1910 Reader Allen Sheffield RAS Monoplane
 1910 Rebikov Schetinin Rossia A biplane
 1910 Rebikov Schetinin Rossia B monoplane
 1910 Requillard Monoplane
 1910 Rhodes Aeroplane
 1910 Roe II triplane
 1910 Roe III triplane
 1910 Roehrig Pusher biplane
 1910 Romanoplane Pusher monoplane
 1910 Rosenman-Rolzewski Tandem Coleopter
 1910 Rossel-Peugeot monoplane
 1910 Rozum-Bechiny Monoplane
 1910 Rougier biplane
 1910 Rusjan EDA V monoplane
 1910 Rusjan EDA VI
 1910 Rusjan EDA VII
 1910 SFLA Monoplane
 1910 Sanchez-Besa Biplane
 1910 Saulnier No.1 monoplane
 1910 Saulnier No.2 monoplane
 1910 Savary Biplane
 1910 SBS Monoplane of the three (Aleksander Sokalski, Kazimierz Baszniak, Wlodzimierz Semiula)
 1910 SCAA Fregates Monoplane
 1910 Schindler Aquila monoplane (Henryk Brzeski (engine), Rudolf Schindler and Wincenty Schindler (airframe))
 1910 Schlegel Zust Monoplane
 1910 Schmitt Biplane
 1910 Schroth ED
 1910 Schuler Doppeldecker
 1910 Sclaves Biplane
 1910 Scottish Aeroplane Syndicate Avis
 1910 Seddon Tandem biplane
 1910 SELA No.2 monoplane
 1910 SFLA Monoplane
 1910 Shkolin Russian Monoplane
 1910 Short No.3 biplane
 1910 Short S.27 pusher biplane
 1910 Siemens-Bourcart Doppeldecker (SSW, Max Bourcart)
 1910 Sikorsky S-2 helicopter
 1910 Sikorsky S-3 tractor biplane
 1910 Sikorsky S-4 biplane
 1910 Simplex Monoplane
 1910 Sippe Monoplane
 1910 Sloan Bicurve biplane
 1910 Smidley Monoplane
 1910 Smith Pusher biplane 2 props
 1910 Smith Rex Biplane 2 seater
 1910 Sommer 1910 biplane
 1910 Sommerville Pusher biplane
 1910 Souchet Monoplane
 1910 Spencer-Stirling Biplane
 1910 Star Monoplane
 1910 Stasenko Lyusik monoplane
 1910 Stein Eindecker
 1910 Svachulay Albatrosz I
 1910 Szarics I monoplane
 1910 Szekely I biplane
 1910 Tan Gen Hydroplane
 1910 Taris Monoplane
 1910 Tellier Monoplane
 1910 Thiersch Monoplane
 1910 Thomann Monoplane
 1910 Thomas Pusher biplane
 1910 Thomas TA amphibian pusher flying boat
 1910 Thompson Biplane
 1910 Tips Biplane
 1910 Todd Biplane
 1910 Toth I monoplane
 1910 Train No.1 monoplane
 1910 Tubavion Monoplane
 1910 Turcat-Mery-Rougier Biplane
 1910 Ufimtsev Spheroplane 1
 1910 Ufimtsev Spheroplane 2
 1910 Van Anden Biplane
 1910 Vasserot Mouette Geante monoplane (Giant Seagull)
 1910 Vendome Tiny monoplane
 1910 Vinet A monoplane
 1910 Vlaicu I
 1910 Voisin Bordeaux
 1910 Voisin Militaire biplane
 1910 Voisin Tourisme biplane
 1910 Voisin Type de Course biplane
 1910 Vollmoeller Monoplane
 1910 Walden No.4 monoplane
 1910 Warchalowski I 1 seater pusher biplane
 1910 Warchalowski II and IIbis 2 seater pusher biplane
 1910 Warchalowski III 1 seater pusher biplane
 1910 Weber Sochacki Pusher biplane 2 seater
 1910 Weidmann Flying tank monoplane
 1910 Weiss Flying wing glider
 1910 White and Thompson No.1
 1910 Willard Biplane
 1910 Willoughby Pelican tractor flying boat
 1910 Willows No.3 airship
 1910 Wills Monoplane (Indian Wilfred Wills)
 1910 Wiseman Biplane
 1910 Wiseman Pusher biplane
 1910 Wisniewski Monoplane 1 seater
 1910 Wright Baby Grand
 1910 Wright Model B
 1910 Wright Model R
 1910 Wright Roadster
 1910 Wrobel Monoplane
 1910 Yamada No.1 airship
 1910 Yuriev Helicopter
 1910 Zenith Monoplane
 1910 Zeppelin LZ-7 Deutschland airship
 1910 Zodiac L'Albatros No.1 monoplane
 1910 Zodiac L'Albatros No.2 monoplane
 1910 Zodiac No.5 airship
 1910 Zodiac No.6 and No.6A airship
 1910 Zodiac No.7 airship
 1910 Zodiac No.8 airship
 1910 Zodiac No.9 airship
 1910 Zselyi Eindecker
 1910 Zselyi Eindecker II

1911

 1911 Adelmann Doppeldecker
 1911 AEG Z2 eindecker
 1911 Aitken Biplane
 1911 Albatros Doppeldecker
 1911 Albatros MZ2 doppeldecker
 1911 Albatros SZ1
 1911 Albatros-Pietschker Renndoppeldecker (Albatros SZ1)
 1911 Antoinette military monoplane
 1911 Antoinette Monobloc
 1911 Arondel Monoplane
 1911 Artigala Argentino 1ro (Enrique Artigalá)
 1911 Ask Monoplane
 1911 Asteria No.3 pusher biplane
 1911 Astra C biplane
 1911 Astra Concourse militaire biplane
 1911 Astra-Torres AT-1 airship
 1911 Aviatic Biplane
 1911 B-S Monoplane
 1911 Balsan Monoplane
 1911 Barillon No.3 monoplane
 1911 Barnwell Monoplane
 1911 Bartelt Ornithopter
 1911 Barucki I monoplane
 1911 Barucki II Biplane
 1911 Bastier Biplane
 1911 Bates Monoplane
 1911 Battaille Triplane
 1911 Beaver Monoplane
 1911 Bellanca Monoplane
 1911 Benoist Headless pusher biplane
 1911 Besson Canard monoplane
 1911 Billing Tractor biplane
 1911 Blackburn Mercury
 1911 Blackburn Tractor monoplane
 1911 Bland Mayfly Biplane
 1911 Blaney Monoplane
 1911 Blériot XV
 1911 Blériot XX Le Poisson monoplane
 1911 Blériot XXI side by side seater monoplane
 1911 Blériot XXIII monoplane
 1911 Blériot XXIV
 1911 Blériot XXV Canard
 1911 Blériot XXVII monoplane
 1911 Blériot XXVIII Populaire monoplane
 1911 Bloudek-Cermak Libella monoplane
 1911 Bloudek-Cermak Libella II biplane
 1911 Bohatyrew Canard monoplane
 1911 Bokor III triplane
 1911 Boland tailless pusher biplane
 1911 Bonnet-Labranche Racer monoplane
 1911 Borel Militaire monoplane 4 seat
 1911 Borucki No.2 pusher biplane
 1911 Breguet U-2 3 seat biplane
 1911 Bristol-Challenger-Low Monoplane
 1911 Bristol Prier monoplane
 1911 Bristol Racing biplane
 1911 Bristol T (also known as Bristol-Challenger-England Biplane or Bristol-Challenger-Dickson Biplane)
 1911 Bronislawski I 2 seater biplane
 1911 Brown Biplane
 1911 Brumarescu Columba Biplane 2 seat
 1911 Bulot Tractor biplane
 1911 Burgess E Baby biplane
 1911 Burgess-Wright F biplane
 1911 Caledonia Monoplane
 1911 Capon Monoplane
 1911 Caproni Ca.4 (1911) biplane
 1911 Caproni Ca.5 (1911) biplane
 1911 Caproni Ca.6 biplane
 1911 Caproni Ca.8 monoplane
 1911 Caproni Ca.9 monoplane
 1911 Carlier Biplane
 1911 Carter Biplane
 1911 Castaibert II monoplane
 1911 Cato Pusher biplane
 1911 Caudron Type N monoplane
 1911 Caudron-Fabre Hydrobiplane
 1911 Cayre Monoplane
 1911 Ceita Monoplane
 1911 Cessna Monoplane
 1911 Champel Biplane
 1911 Chase-Gouverneur Wrightsville beach multiplane
 1911 Chazal Monoplane
 1911 Chechet Ushkov Rebikov ChUR-1 biplane
 1911 Chedeville No.2 monoplane
 1911 Cihak D
 1911 Clement Louis Steel tube biplane
 1911 Clement-Bayard Monoplane
 1911 Coanda Biplane
 1911 Coanda Monoplane
 1911 Cody III biplane
 1911 Copin Tractor monoplane
 1911 Crocco and Ricaldoni P3 airship
 1911 Curtiss A-1 Triad pusher amphibian
 1911 Curtiss Amphibian triplane
 1911 Curtiss Canoe biplane
 1911 Curtiss D Headless amphibian
 1911 Curtiss E hydroplane
 1911 Dajoigny et Beaussart Minimum monoplane
 1911 De Brageas Monoplane
 1911 De Brouckere Biplane
 1911 De La Hault Biplane
 1911 De Marcay-Moonen Folding wing monoplane
 1911 De Nissole Monoplane
 1911 Dechenne Biplane
 1911 Demkin Biplane (Georgiy Konstantinovich Demkin, Георгий Константинович Демкин)
 1911 Denhaut Flying boat biplane
 1911 Deperdussin Type B monoplane
 1911 Deperdussin Militaire monoplane
 1911 Deperdussin Grenoble monoplane
 1911 Deperdussin Type C monoplane
 1911 DFW Doppeldecker
 1911 Dinoird Monoplane
 1911 Dixon Nipper No.1 monoplane
 1911 Donnet-Leveque A
 1911 Dorner Eindecker
 1911 Du Breuil Monoplane No.1
 1911 Du Breuil Monoplane No.2
 1911 Du Breuil Monoplane No.3
 1911 Dufaux 5 doppeldecker
 1911 Dufaux Floatplane
 1911 Dunne D.6 monoplane
 1911 Dunne D.7 all wing auto safety monoplane
 1911 Dux Yastreb airship
 1911 Edwards Rhomboidal
 1911 Emblem Biplane
 1911 Eparvier Monoplane
 1911 Epps Monoplane
 1911 Ery Monoplane
 1911 Escher Monoplane
 1911 Esnault-Pelterie REP Biplane
 1911 Esnault-Pelterie REP De Course monoplane
 1911 Esnault-Pelterie REP F monoplane
 1911 Etrich Etrichapparat eindecker
 1911 Etrich IV Manövertaube Type B military 2-seater monoplane
 1911 Etrich VII Renntaube 3 seater racing monoplane
 1911 Euler Eindecker
 1911 Euler Military pusher doppeldecker
 1911 Euler Schuldreidecker training pusher triplane
 1911 Farman Monoplane 2 seat
 1911 Farman HF.VI Militaire 2 seat pusher biplane
 1911 Farman HF.VII
 1911 Farman HF.X 3 seater pusher biplane
 1911 Farman HF.Xbis 3 seater pusher biplane
 1911 Farman MF.II staggered biplane (Maurice Farman)
 1911 Fisk Monoplane
 1911 Fitch Biplane
 1911 Fitzsimmons Pusher monoplane
 1911 Flanders F.2 monoplane
 1911 Flanders F.3 2 seater monoplane
 1911 Fokker M1 2 seat monoplane
 1911 Fokker Spinn tractor monoplane
 1911 Fokker Spinn 2 monoplane
 1911 Francis Biplane twin engined
 1911 Fritz Monoplane
 1911 Fumat Monoplane
 1911 Gabardini Le Monaco monoplane
 1911 Gakkel IV biplane
 1911 Gakkel V
 1911 Gakkel VI biplane
 1911 Gakkel VII biplane
 1911 Garuda Moewe Eindecker (Seagull)
 1911 Gassier Sylphe Monoplane
 1911 Gaudard Monoplane rigid trussed beam 
 1911 Gaunt Biplane No.2 Baby
 1911 Gibson Multiplane
 1911 Glowinski monoplane
 1911 Goldschmidt Monoplane
 1911 Goupy No.2
 1911 Goupy No.3
 1911 Grahame-White Baby biplane
 1911 Grahame-White School Biplane
 1911 Grapperon Monoplane
 1911 Gray Monoplane
 1911 Guyard Monoplane
 1911 Guyot et Verdier Biplane
 1911 Haefelin Eindecker
 1911 Hamel Biplane
 1911 Hammond Triplane
 1911 Handley Page D monoplane
 1911 Hanriot Monoplane VI
 1911 Harel Biplane
 1911 Harlan Eindecker
 1911 Hawkins-Ogilvie Triplane
 1911 Hayot Monoplane
 1911 Henkel Biplane
 1911 Hiller Hydroplane
 1911 Hiller Monoplane
 1911 Hino 2 monoplane
 1911 HMA No.1 Mayfly airship
 1911 Horvath II monoplane
 1911 Horvath IIIA monoplane
 1911 Humber Biplane
 1911 Humphrey No.3 monoplane
 1911 Jatho Stahltaube
 1911 Jero N° 9 Antwerpen
 1911 Jezzi No.2 sesquiplane
 1911 Johnson Monoplane
 1911 Kaishiki No.1 biplane
 1911 Karpeka 1bis
 1911 Kassa Ery 1 biplane
 1911 Kassa Ery 2 monoplane
 1911 Kaufmann No.3 monoplane
 1911 Kaufmann No.4 De Course monoplane
 1911 Kiraly-Berkovics Monoplane
 1911 Kolbany II monoplane
 1911 Kolbany III monoplane
 1911 Koolhoven F.K.1 Heidevogel biplane
 1911 Kordin Monoplane
 1911 Kudashev 4 monoplane
 1911 Kvasz II monoplane
 1911 Lakes Water Bird seaplane
 1911 Lasternas Biplane
 1911 Lebaudy No.8 airship
 1911 Lebaudy No.9 capitaine Marchal airship
 1911 Lebaudy No.10 airship
 1911 Lebedev PTA-1 folding wing biplane
 1911 Lecoq-Monteiro-Aillaud Monoplane
 1911 Lefebvre Concours Militaire monoplane
 1911 Lefebvre La Mouette monoplane (Gull)
 1911 Leforestier Monoplane
 1911 Lennert Biplane
 1911 Libanski Jaskolka biplane
 1911 Liore et Olivier Monoplane
 1911 Lobanov L-1
 1911 Loening Flying boat
 1911 Lohner-Etrich Taube A military monoplane
 1911 Long Monoplane
 1911 Longren Biplane
 1911 Loose Pusher biplane
 1911 Loubery Biplane
 1911 Macfie Circuit biplane
 1911 Mamet Monoplane 2 seater
 1911 Mannsbarth-Stagl Airship
 1911 Marinescu Bomber
 1911 Martin Pusher biplane
 1911 Martin-Handasyde No.4B
 1911 Martin-Handasyde No.5
 1911 Martinaisse Pusher monoplane
 1911 Maurin et Willaume Monoplane
 1911 McCormick-James Master plaster monoplane
 1911 McCormick-Romme Umbrellaplane
 1911 McCormick-Romme Cycloplane
 1911 McCurdy Headless pusher biplane
 1911 Mercep Monoplane
 1911 Mersey monoplane
 1911 Merx Himmelsleiter funfdecker
 1911 Moisant Monoplane
 1911 Molon Monoplane
 1911 Monnier-Harper Monoplane
 1911 Montgomery Evergreen monoplane glider
 1911 Morane-Borel Militaire monoplane 2 seater
 1911 Morane-Borel monoplane
 1911 Morane-Saulnier A Ecole 1 seater monoplane
 1911 Morane-Saulnier B tandem 2 seater monoplane
 1911 Morane-Saulnier C 1 seater monoplane
 1911 Morane-Saulnier HS Ecole 2 seater monoplane
 1911 Morane-Saulnier PP 1 seater monoplane
 1911 Morane-Saulnier Rebikoff 3 seater monoplane
 1911 Morane-Saulnier TB 2 seater armoured military monoplane
 1911 Morita Monoplane
 1911 Narahara No.2 biplane
 1911 Narahara No.3 biplane
 1911 Nieuport IV monoplane
 1911 Nieuport IVM Militaire monoplane
 1911 Noel Le Moineau biplane
 1911 North Biplane glider 
 1911 Nottingham Monoplane
 1911 Nyrop Monoplane
 1911 Obre No.4 monoplane
 1911 Oertz Eindecker
 1911 Paterson No.2 biplane
 1911 Paulhan biplane
 1911 Paulhan triplane l
 1911 Paulhan-Tatin Aéro-Torpille
 1911 Pelliat Monoplane
 1911 Pepper Biplane
 1911 Percival 1 biplane
 1911 Pietschker Taube (Alfred Pietschker)
 1911 Piffard No.2 biplane
 1911 Piggott Monoplane
 1911 Pischoff Autoplans monoplane
 1911 Pivot-Koechlin monoplane
 1911 Plage-Court Torpedo I monoplane
 1911 Planes Monoplane
 1911 Pochin Biplane
 1911 Poix et Deroig Monoplane
 1911 Ponnier F1 biplane
 1911 Ponnier F1bis biplane
 1911 Poulain Orange No.2 monoplane
 1911 Porokhovschikov 1 monoplane
 1911 Prier monoplane
 1911 Proudhon Monoplane
 1911 Queen Monoplane
 1911 Queen-Martin Biplane
 1911 R.A.A. Kretchet airship
 1911 Radley & Moorhouse Monoplane
 1911 Radley Gull wing monoplane
 1911 Rodjestveisky Triplane
 1911 Roe IV triplane
 1911 Roe Duigan
 1911 Roe D
 1911 Royal Aircraft Factory B.E.1
 1911 Royal Aircraft Factory B.E.2
 1911 Royal Aircraft Factory F.E.1
 1911 Royal Aircraft Factory F.E.2
 1911 Royal Aircraft Factory S.E.1
 1911 Ragot Monoplane (Henri Ragot and Louis Ragot, Adrien Lacroix, New York NY)
 1911 Raison Monoplane
 1911 Rebikoff Biplane
 1911 Restan Monoplane
 1911 Roux Monoplane 2 seater
 1911 Ruchonnet Le Cigare monoplane
 1911 Ruchonnet-Schemmel Monoplane
 1911 Ruehl Monoplane
 1911 Sablatnig Baby (first aircraft of Carinthian Josef Sablatnig)
 1911 SAC Caledonia monoplane
 1911 Salvador Monoplane
 1911 Sanders No.2 biplane I
 1911 Sanders No.2 biplane II
 1911 Sarri Monoplane
 1911 Saru-Ionescu Monoplane 1 seater
 1911 Sato & Davis Biplane
 1911 Savary Biplane 2 props
 1911 Schmitt Biplane
 1911 Schreck Diapason I
 1911 Schudeisky Eindecker
 1911 Schutte Lanz S.L.1 airship
 1911 Sexton Monoplane
 1911 Short S.39 triple twin
 1911 Short Tandem-Twin
 1911 Siemens-Schuckert Airship I
 1911 Siemens-Schuckert Eindecker
 1911 Sikorsky S-5 and S-5A biplane
 1911 Sikorsky S-6 biplane
 1911 Sirius Monoplane
 1911 Skinner Monoplane
 1911 Sloan Concours militaire biplane
 1911 Sloan Twin tractor bicurve biplane
 1911 Smith Monoplane
 1911 Sommer Aerobus Grand pusher biplane
 1911 Sommer De Campagne biplane
 1911 Sommer De Course tractor biplane
 1911 Sommer Rapide L biplane
 1911 Spainhour Monoplane
 1911 Sperry Tractor biplane
 1911 Star monoplane
 1911 Steco Hydraplane biplane
 1911 Steffen Taube
 1911 Steglau No.1 biplane
 1911 Stewart Biplane
 1911 Suchard Airship
 1911 SVA Minimum monoplane
 1911 Svachulay Albatrosz II
 1911 Svachulay Hummingbird II
 1911 Szarics II monoplane
 1911 Szekely II Canard pusher monoplane
 1911 Taddeoli Eindecker
 1911 Takacs I monoplane
 1911 Tellier Monoplane
 1911 Teodorescu Monoplane
 1911 Thomann Monoplane
 1911 Thomas Headless biplane
 1911 Toth II monoplane
 1911 Tonini Monorebus (Alessandro Tonini)
 1911 Train No.2 1 and 2 seat monoplane
 1911 Tsuzuku No.1 pusher monoplane
 1911 Tucek II 1 seater monoplane
 1911 Universal Aviation Company Birdling monoplane
 1911 Van Den Burg Monoplane
 1911 Vass Monoplane
 1911 Vedo Vili
 1911 Vendome Elliptical wing monoplane
 1911 Vendome Gull wing monoplane
 1911 Vickers No.1 monoplane
 1911 Vickers No.2-V monoplane
 1911 Vinet B monoplane
 1911 Vinet D monoplane
 1911 Vlach III monoplane
 1911 Vlaicu II
 1911 Vogel Monoplane (bird)
 1911 Voisin 17 metres canard
 1911 Voisin-Bristol Monoplane
 1911 Voisin Canard
 1911 Walden Monoplane
 1911 Walsh Biplane
 1911 Walton-Edwards Colossoplane biplane
 1911 Warchalowski IV 1 seater pusher biplane
 1911 Warchalowski V 1 seater pusher biplane
 1911 Warchalowski VI 1 seater tractor biplane
 1911 Warchalowski VII and VIIbis 1 seater pusher biplane
 1911 Warchalowski VIII 1 seater pusher biplane
 1911 Warchalowski IX pusher biplane
 1911 Warchalowski X biplane
 1911 Watson No.2 biplane
 1911 Weiss No.2 Sylvia tractor monoplane
 1911 Wiencziers Renneindecker (first retractable undercarriage Eugen Wiencziers)
 1911 Wildeblood Triplane
 1911 Willing Monoplane
 1911 Wilson-Gibson Monoplane
 1911 Wiseman-Noonen Biplane
 1911 Wisniewski Monoplane
 1911 Wright Model EX
 1911 Yamada Kai-Shiki I-Go airship
 1911 Yamada No.2 airship
 1911 Yamada No.3 airship
 1911 Young-Hearne Biplane
 1911 Zbieranski and Cywinski Biplane
 1911 Zens High wing monoplane
 1911 Zeppelin LZ-8 Deutschland II airship
 1911 Zeppelin LZ-10 Schwaben airship
 1911 Zodiac No.3 biplane pusher
 1911 Zodiac No.4 biplane 2 seater tractor
 1911 Zodiac No.10 airship
 1911 Zodiac No.11 capitaine Ferber airship
 1911 Zurovec Doppeldecker

1912

 1912 ABF Delta airship (also known as British Army Airship Delta)
 1912 Abramovich Biplane
 1912 AEG Z3 doppeldecker
 1912 Aerial Wheel Syndicate Monoplane
 1912 Albatros DD1 Pfeil doppeldecker
 1912 Albatros Doppeltaube
 1912 Albatros F2 doppeldecker
 1912 Albatros WM2 doppeldecker
 1912 Albessard Aerobus
 1912 Amiot 1
 1912 Antoni Monoplane
 1912 Arnoux Flying wing
 1912 Arsenal Seaplane
 1912 Artois Aerotorpille biplane
 1912 ASL Viking
 1912 Astra Hydrobiplane
 1912 Astra Triplane
 1912 Astra CM biplane
 1912 Auto-Fiacre
 1912 Aviatik AK1 doppeldecker
 1912 Aviatik Taube
 1912 Avro 500
 1912 Avro F with enclosed flight deck
 1912 Avro G with enclosed flight deck
 1912 BCD No.1 El Cangrejo biplane
 1912 Barillon No.4 monoplane
 1912 Bates Monoplane
 1912 Beech National biplane
 1912 Behueghe Monoplane
 1912 Benoist Biplane flying boat
 1912 Benoist XII 2 seater tractor biplane
 1912 Benton II tractor biplane
 1912 Berthaud Monoplane
 1912 Bertin No.5 2 seater monoplane
 1912 Blackburn III tractor monoplane
 1912 Blackburn Tractor monoplane 1 seater
 1912 Blackburn E military tractor monoplane
 1912 Blériot XXXIII Canard Bleu
 1912 Blériot XXXVI Torpille monoplane
 1912 Blériot XXXVIbis
 1912 Blinderman-Gilbert Monoplane
 1912 Boemcher I airship
 1912 Boemcher II airship
 1912 Boland tailless pusher biplane
 1912 Bomhard Pfeil doppeldecker
 1912 Borel Hydromonoplane 2 seater
 1912 Borel Monoplane
 1912 Borel O BUS monoplane
 1912 Botyanszky MB-1
 1912 Breguet U tractor biplane, U-2 hydravion and Militaire tractor biplane
 1912 Bristol Coanda Monoplane
 1912 Bristol G.E.2 biplane
 1912 Bristol G.E.3 2 seater biplane
 1912 Bronislawski II 2 seater biplane
 1912 Brule Biplane
 1912 Burgess H military tractor biplane
 1912 Burgess-Gill Twin hydro biplane
 1912 Burgess-Wright Military biplane
 1912 Burney X.2 seaplane
 1912 Calderara Seaplane
 1912 Call II monoplane
 1912 Camo y Acedo Biplane
 1912 Caproni Ca.13 monoplane
 1912 Caproni Ca.16 monoplane
 1912 Caproni Ca.18 monoplane
 1912 Castaibert III monoplane
 1912 Cato Pusher biplane
 1912 Caudron C and D
 1912 Caudron M monoplane
 1912 Caudron Monaco pusher seaplane
 1912 Caudron Special
 1912 Cayol Monoplane
 1912 Cessna Silver wings monoplane
 1912 Champel No.4 pusher biplane
 1912 Chanter Monoplane
 1912 Cheramy-Gilbert Amphibian canard monoplane
 1912 Chiribiri No.5 2 seater tractor monoplane
 1912 Christofferson Curtiss Headless pusher biplane
 1912 Christofferson Trainer biplane
 1912 Church and Sherwood Biplane
 1912 Cihak E
 1912 Cihak F
 1912 Cihak G 2 seater monoplane
 1912 Cihak H 1 seater monoplane
 1912 Cihak J 2 seater monoplane
 1912 Cihak Rapid A 1 seater monoplane
 1912 Cihak Rapid C 1 seater monoplane
 1912 Cirulis
 1912 Clement-Bayard Biplane
 1912 Clement-Bayard Monoplane
 1912 Coventry 10 biplane
 1912 CPC Monoplane 2 seater
 1912 Crocco and Ricaldoni M1 airship
 1912 Crocco and Ricaldoni M2 airship
 1912 Crocco and Ricaldoni P4 airship
 1912 Crocco and Ricaldoni P5 airship
 1912 Clement-Bayard No.3 airship
 1912 Clement-Bayard No.4 Adjudant Vincenot airship
 1912 Cockburn Biplane
 1912 Cody IV monoplane
 1912 Cody V biplane
 1912 Cooke Flying boat biplane
 1912 Cooke No.1 pusher biplane
 1912 Copin Monoplane
 1912 Cordner Monoplane No.2
 1912 COW No.10 biplane
 1912 COW No.11 biplane
 1912 Crocco and Ricaldoni Hydroplane
 1912 Csok Monoplane
 1912 Curtiss A-2 pusher biplane
 1912 Curtiss E flying boat
 1912 Curtiss OWL pusher biplane flying boat
 1912 Dajoigny et Beaussart 3rd monoplane
 1912 Danard et Nayout Pusher biplane
 1912 Darmstadt Gleiter
 1912 Day Tractor biplane
 1912 De Beer 3 monoplane
 1912 De Beer 4 monoplane
 1912 De Brouckere Biplane
 1912 Decazes Helicoplane
 1912 De Marcay-Moonen L'Abeille monoplane (Bee)
 1912 De Marcay-Moonen Monoplane
 1912 Debongnie Monoplane
 1912 Demazel Biplane
 1912 Deperdussin L'Espervier F monoplane
 1912 Deperdussin Monocoque and Grand Prix d'Anjou monoplane
 1912 Deperdussin Racing monoplane
 1912 Deperdussin Tamise amphibian monoplane
 1912 DFW Mars Pfeil 2 seater eindecker and doppeldecker
 1912 Diakov Monoplane
 1912 Dokuchaev 2 biplane
 1912 Donnet-Leveque B
 1912 Donnet-Leveque C
 1912 Dorand Laboratoire biplane
 1912 Dornier Doppeldecker 2 seater
 1912 Doutre Biplane
 1912 Drzewiecki Canard monoplane (also known as Dzhevetsky)
 1912 Duflou and Konstantinovich Kobchik airship
 1912 Dunne D.7bis all wing monoplane
 1912 Dux 1 biplane
 1912 Dux Meller 1 pusher monoplane
 1912 Ecker Flying boat
 1912 EFW Etrich XII Rennapparat 2-seater bomber monoplane
 1912 Ellehammer helicopter
 1912 Epps Monoplane
 1912 Erdody Biplane
 1912 Erdody Monoplane
 1912 Esnault-Pelterie REP K hydromonoplane
 1912 Etrich IX Schwalbe eindecker
 1912 Etrich Manövertaube Type F 2-seater military monoplane
 1912 Etrich Luft-Limousine
 1912 Euler Amphibian pusher dreidecker
 1912 Euler Eindecker (not a Taube)
 1912 Euler Gelber Hund pusher doppeldecker 2 seater
 1912 Euler Taube
 1912 Faccioli No.6 monoplane
 1912 Farman Amphibian pusher biplane
 1912 Farman HF.XI big 2 seater seaplane
 1912 Farman HF.XIV 4 and 5 seater pusher biplane
 1912 Farman HF.XV 2 seater pusher biplane
 1912 Farman HF.XVI single bay sesquiplane
 1912 Farmann Le Babillard biplane
 1912 FBA 26 biplane flying boat
 1912 Feng Ru No.2 biplane (Fung Joe Guey, Fung Guey, Fung Yuen, Fong Yu, Fung Yu etc.) 
 1912 Flanders B.2
 1912 Flanders F.4
 1912 Fokker IIIB monoplane
 1912 Fokker M2 monoplane
 1912 Fokker M3 2 seater monoplane
 1912 Fokker M4 2 seater trainer monoplane
 1912 Fowler-Gage Tractor biplane
 1912 Frassinetti La Colomba monoplane
 1912 Friedrichshafen FF1
 1912 Gabardini Flying boat
 1912 Gage Biplane
 1912 Gage-Fowler Biplane
 1912 Gakkel VIII biplane
 1912 Gakkel IX monoplane
 1912 Gandy-Vrang Monoplane 2 seater
 1912 Garaix Monoplane 2 seater metal construction
 1912 Garbero-Becue Monoplane
 1912 Garnier Biplane
 1912 Gallaudet A-1 Bullet pusher monoplane
 1912 Gavault Monoplane
 1912 Gayot Monoplane
 1912 Gerard et Salkin Gesa hydromonoplane
 1912 Gilbert Canard monoplane
 1912 Ginnochio Flying boat
 1912 Gluck Taube
 1912 Gnosspelius No.2 hydromonoplane
 1912 Goedecker Sturmvogel eindecker
 1912 Goodden Dragonfly monoplane
 1912 Gourvene Biplane
 1912 Grade Seaplane
 1912 Grandjean Hydravion monoplane
 1912 Grizodubov 4 monoplane
 1912 Groth II monoplane
 1912 Hammer & Krollmann Eindecker
 1912 Handley Page E 2 seater monoplane
 1912 Handley Page F 2 seater monoplane
 1912 Hanriot Monoplane
 1912 Hanuschke Eindecker
 1912 Harlan Doppeldecker
 1912 Harlan Eindecker
 1912 Harriman Biplane
 1912 Hirondelle Monoplane
 1912 Horvath Military monoplane 2 seater
 1912 Horvath IIIB monoplane
 1912 Horvath IIIC Fecske monoplane
 1912 Hubner Eindecker
 1912 IAC X 2 place tractor biplane
 1912 Jatho Eindecker
 1912 Jeannin Eindecker
 1912 Jeannin Stahltaube
 1912 Jezzi No.2 biplane
 1912 Jones Monoplane (L. J. R. (Leslie) Jones)
 1912 Kaishiki No.2 pusher biplane
 1912 Kalep Biplane 2 engines
 1912 Kalep Monoplane
 1912 Karpeka 2 biplane
 1912 Kassa Ery 3 monoplane
 1912 Khioni Monoplane
 1912 Kirkham Racer biplane
 1912 Kolbanyi IV
 1912 Kolbanyi V monoplane
 1912 Kuhlstein Eindecker
 1912 Kvasz III monoplane
 1912 Kvasz IV monoplane
 1912 Kvasz-Torsz Godron biplane
 1912 Ladougne La Colombo No.1 monoplane
 1912 Ladougne La Colombo No.2 monoplane
 1912 Lakes Water Hen
 1912 Lakes Sea Bird seaplane
 1912 Lanyi Biplane
 1912 Lavesvre et Veillon monoplane 2 seater
 1912 Leblic Biplane
 1912 Leclerc Monoplane
 1912 Lecomte Monoplane
 1912 Lecoq-Monteiro-Aillaud Monoplane
 1912 Leforestier Monoplane
 1912 Lemaitre-Maucourt-Legrand Monoplane
 1912 Lerke Yankovsky Mosca LYaM 1 seater monoplane
 1912 Letai II biplane
 1912 Letai III biplane
 1912 Letai IV monoplane
 1912 Leyat Biplane
 1912 Lohner B.I doppeldecker
 1912 Lohner Pfeilflieger II doppeldecker
 1912 Lohner Pfeilflieger Sport type Hold
 1912 LVG B.I doppeldecker
 1912 LVG Doppeldecker
 1912 Marshall Biplane
 1912 Martin Pusher biplane 2 seater
 1912 Martin-Handasyde Military trial
 1912 Meckler-Allen New York hydrobiplane
 1912 Mercader y Bernal Biplane
 1912 Mercep Monoplane
 1912 Montgolfier Monoplane
 1912 Morane-Saulnier Monoplane
 1912 Morane-Saulnier Type Canton 3 seater monoplane
 1912 Morane-Saulnier Type E monoplane
 1912 Morane-Saulnier Type G and Type G Parasol monoplane
 1912 Morane-Saulnier Type Garros 1 seater monoplane
 1912 Morane-Saulnier Type H 1 seater monoplane
 1912 Morane-Saulnier Type J 2 seater touring monoplane
 1912 Morane-Saulnier Type K racing hydromonoplane
 1912 Morane-Saulnier Type M armoured
 1912 Morane-Saulnier Type Renault 2 seater monoplane
 1912 Morane-Saulnier Type WR 2 seater armoured monoplane
 1912 Moreau Military aerostable monoplane
 1912 Mountaineer Pusher biplane
 1912 Mrozinski Eindecker
 1912 Narahara Otori biplane
 1912 NFW E5 eindecker
 1912 Nieuport IV G hydromonoplane
 1912 Oertz Eindecker
 1912 Otto Renndoppeldecker racer
 1912 Palmgren Monoplane (David A. Palmgren)
 1912 Passat Seagull monoplane
 1912 Paterson Twin tractor biplane
 1912 Paulat Monoplane
 1912 Paumier No.2 biplane
 1912 Peck Columbia biplane
 1912 Pippart-Noll PN1 eindecker
 1912 Pippart-Noll PN2 eindecker
 1912 Plage-Court Torpedo II monoplane
 1912 Ponche-Primaud Tubavion
 1912 Ponnier D.I monoplane
 1912 Pons Pusher canard monoplane
 1912 Poulain Orange No.3 monoplane
 1912 Prodam I monoplane
 1912 Prodam II 2 seater monoplane
 1912 Queen Aeroboat flying boat monoplane
 1912 Reichelt Eindecker 2 seater
 1912 Reissner Canard monoplane
 1912 Reiter No.1 monoplane
 1912 Reiter No.2 monoplane
 1912 Rex Monoplane
 1912 Rimailho Biplane
 1912 Roe-Burga monoplane
 1912 Roe E
 1912 Roe F
 1912 Roe G
 1912 Roux-Garaix Monoplane
 1912 Rover Eindecker
 1912 Royal Aircraft Factory B.E.3
 1912 Royal Aircraft Factory B.E.4
 1912 Royal Aircraft Factory B.E.5
 1912 Royal Aircraft Factory B.E.6
 1912 Rowell Monoplane
 1912 Rumpler Taube
 1912 Ruth Rohde Doppeldecker I
 1912 Ruth Rohde Doppeldecker II
 1912 SAC Dart monoplane
 1912 Saigai Monoplane
 1912 Saint George Helicopter
 1912 Salvez Monoplane
 1912 Sanchez-Besa Biplane
 1912 Sanchez-Besa Seaplane
 1912 Savary Biplane
 1912 Savary Floatplane
 1912 Savary Military biplane
 1912 Schlegel Monoplane
 1912 Schreck Diapason II
 1912 Schulze Eindecker I
 1912 Schulze Eindecker II
 1912 Schulze Eindecker III
 1912 Shigeno Biplane
 1912 Shiukov Canard 1 monoplane
 1912 Short S.33 dual control floatplane
 1912 Short S.36 tractor biplane
 1912 Short S.41 amphibian tractor biplane
 1912 Short S.42 tractor monoplane
 1912 Short S.45 tractor biplane
 1912 Short S.47 Field kitchen triple tractor biplane
 1912 Short S.80 Nile floatplane
 1912 Short S.38 pusher biplane
 1912 Sigismund Eindecker
 1912 Sikorsky S-6A biplane
 1912 Sikorsky S-6B biplane
 1912 Sikorsky S-7 monoplane
 1912 Sikorsky S-8 Malyutka biplane
 1912 Sloan Biplane
 1912 Smith Monoplane
 1912 Smith Multiplane
 1912 Sommer Floatbiplane
 1912 Sommer E monoplane
 1912 Sommer K pusher biplane
 1912 Sommer Monoplane
 1912 Sommer R biplane
 1912 Sommer Reliable biplane
 1912 Sonoda Biplane
 1912 Sopwith 3-Seater tractor biplane
 1912 Sopwith-Wright Twin pusher biplane
 1912 Sparling Biplane
 1912 Spencer biplane
 1912 Steglau No.2 biplane
 1912 Suranyi I monoplane
 1912 SVA 3 monoplane
 1912 Svachulay Albatrosz III
 1912 Svachulay Hummingbird III
 1912 Szekely III Az Ujsag monoplane
 1912 Taddeoli-Perrot Mouette canard floatplane
 1912 Takacs II monoplane
 1912 Takacs III monoplane
 1912 Takacs IV monoplane
 1912 Tereschenko Zembinsky Monoplane
 1912 Thomas B-4 pusher flying boat
 1912 Thomas Pusher monoplane
 1912 Thomas-Morse TA tractor flying boat
 1912 Toth III monoplane
 1912 Train No.3 monoplane
 1912 Tsuzuki Monoplane No.2
 1912 Vendome Militaire monoplane
 1912 Vickers No.6 monoplane
 1912 Villard Helicopter
 1912 Vinet F 2 seater monoplane
 1912 Vlach Monoplane
 1912 Voisin Icare Aero-Yacht
 1912 Voisin Monaco canard
 1912 Von Preussen Monoplane
 1912 Wakadori Biplane
 1912 Warchalowski XI 2 seat floatplane
 1912 Washington Columbia monoplane
 1912 Wetterwald Eindecker
 1912 Williams Biplane
 1912 Williams Monoplane
 1912 Willows No.4 airship
 1912 Wittber Biplane
 1912 Wright Model C
 1912 Wright Model D
 1912 Yuriev Helicopter
 1912 Zens No.3 monoplane
 1912 Zeppelin LZ-11 airship
 1912 Zeppelin LZ-12 Z-III airship
 1912 Zeppelin LZ-13 Hansa airship
 1912 Zeppelin LZ-14 L-1 airship
 1912 Ziegler Eindecker (Ziegler Pfeil eindecker? Albert Ziegler)
 1912 Zsemlye Monoplane
 1912 Zurovec Eindecker 1 seat

1913

 1913 ABF Epsilon airship (also known as British Army Airship Epsilon)
 1913 AEG B.I doppeldecker
 1913 Ago E.I eindecker
 1913 Ago Seaplane
 1913 Albatros B.I doppeldecker
 1913 Albatros DD2 Pfeil doppeldecker
 1913 Albatros DE doppeldecker
 1913 Albatros DL1 doppeldecker
 1913 Albatros EE eindecker
 1913 Albatros K351 doppeldecker
 1913 Albatros RE1 eindecker
 1913 Albatros Taube
 1913 Albatros WDD floatplane
 1913 Alfaro I
 1913 Andreansky
 1913 Antoni Monoplane
 1913 Arnoux Flying wing
 1913 Artois Flying boat
 1913 Astra-Torres AT-13 airship
 1913 Atwood Floatbiplane
 1913 Autostable Monoplane
 1913 Aviatik C.I doppeldecker
 1913 Aviatik P14 doppeldecker
 1913 Avro 501
 1913 Avro 503
 1913 Avro 504
 1913 Bachelier-Dupont-Baudrin Biplane flying boat
 1913 Badaire Monoplane
 1913 Balassian de Manawas Monoplane
 1913 Baltic Kovanko airship
 1913 Bathiat-Sanchez E monoplane
 1913 Bathiat-Sanchez Floatplane
 1913 Bathiat-Sanchez Pusher biplane
 1913 Batson Dragonfly six wing flying boat
 1913 Baumbach Eindecker
 1913 BCD No.2 monoplane
 1913 Benoist Type XIV 2 seater pusher biplane flying boat
 1913 Berger Monoplane
 1913 Blackburn Tractor monoplane 2 seater
 1913 Blanc Monoplane
 1913 Blériot XL tandem seater pusher biplane
 1913 Blériot XLII pusher canard 
 1913 Blériot XLIII tandem armored monoplane
 1913 Blériot XLIV Artillaire monoplane
 1913 Blériot XLV monoplane
 1913 Blériot XXXIX armoured monoplane
 1913 Bloudek-Cermak Bohemia B I 1 seater monoplane
 1913 Bloudek-Cermak Bohemia B II 1 seater monoplane
 1913 Boland Biplane
 1913 Boland Triplane
 1913 Borel Aeroyacht Denhaut I
 1913 Borel Aeroyacht Denhaut II
 1913 Borel Aeroyacht Denhaut III
 1913 Borel hydro-monoplane 2 seater
 1913 Borel Monoplane
 1913 Borel Ruby pusher monoplane
 1913 Borel Torpille monoplane
 1913 Borel Militaire monoplane
 1913 Borel Monaco flying boat
 1913 Botyanksy MB-2
 1913 Breguet G-4 amphibian
 1913 Breguet H-U3 hydravion
 1913 Breguet La Marseillaise monoplane flying boat
 1913 Bristol Coanda BR.7 biplane
 1913 Bristol Coanda BR.8 biplane
 1913 Bristol Coanda Hydrobiplane
 1913 Bristol Halberstadt Taube
 1913 Bristol Scout
 1913 Bristol TB.8 biplane
 1913 Bruneau-Parant Monoplane
 1913 Burgess I Scout hydroaeroplane
 1913 Burgess K biplane flying boat
 1913 Burgess-Collier Biplane flying boat
 1913 Burgess-Dunne Aerohydroplane
 1913 Burgess-Wright Hydrobiplane flying boat
 1913 Burney X.3 seaplane
 1913 Caproni Ca.20 monoplane
 1913 Caproni Ca.22 monoplane
 1913 Caproni Ca.25 monoplane
 1913 Castaibert IV monoplane
 1913 Caudron Type F
 1913 Caudron Type G 2 seater biplane
 1913 Caudron Type J tractor
 1913 Caudron Type K big pusher seaplane
 1913 Christofferson D hydroplane
 1913 Christofferson Hydroplane
 1913 Clement-Bayard Adjudant Vincenot airship
 1913 Clement-Bayard Biplane
 1913 Clement-Bayard Monoplane
 1913 Crocco and Ricaldoni M3 airship
 1913 Clement-Bayard Montgolfier airship
 1913 Clement-Bayard No.5 airship
 1913 Cody floatplane
 1913 Constantin-Astanieres Safety monoplane
 1913 Cooke tractor biplane
 1913 Cooper Biplane
 1913 Copin-Revillard Monoplane
 1913 Crawford Pusher biplane
 1913 Curtiss A-3 US Navy amphibian
 1913 Curtiss F 2 seater flying boat
 1913 Curtiss G scout biplane
 1913 Dahlbeck Biplane
 1913 Daimler-Lutskoy No.3 monoplane
 1913 De Brageas Monoplane
 1913 De Langhe-Corville Monoplane
 1913 De Marcay-Moonen Seaplane
 1913 De Monge Parasol monoplane
 1913 De Simone Parasol monoplane
 1913 Deperdussin Monaco floatplane
 1913 Deperdussin Seagull seaplane
 1913 DFW Stahltaube 2 seater eindecker
 1913 Donnet-Leveque Flying boat
 1913 Dorand DO1 biplane
 1913 Drzewiecki Canard monoplane (also known as Dzhevetsky)
 1913 Duigan Tractor biplane No.2
 1913 Dunne D.8 biplane
 1913 Dunne D.8bis biplane
 1913 Dux 2 monoplane
 1913 Dux Meller 2 E pusher biplane
 1913 Dux Meller 3 monoplane
 1913 Dybovski Delphin monoplane
 1913 Dybovski Nieuport Monoplane
 1913 Dyott monoplane
 1913 Eastbourne Monoplane
 1913 EFW Etrich Taube Type 1913 2-seater bomber monoplane
 1913 Esnault-Pelterie REP I monoplane
 1913 Euler Eindecker
 1913 Euler Military doppeldecker
 1913 Euler Military dreidecker
 1913 Euler Sea reconnaissance dreidecker
 1913 Euler Stahltaube
 1913 Falts-Fein Biplane
 1913 Farman HF.XIX pusher hydrobiplane
 1913 Farman HF.XX pusher biplane
 1913 Farman HF.XXII pusher biplane
 1913 Farman HF.XXIV pusher biplane
 1913 Farman MF.VII biplane
 1913 Farman MF.X seaplane
 1913 Farman MF.XI and MF.XIbis
 1913 Farman MF.XVII hydroplane
 1913 FBA 27 biplane flying boat
 1913 FBA 28 biplane flying boat
 1913 Fisher Monoplane
 1913 Fjallback Naktergaten monoplane
 1913 Flanders B.3
 1913 Flanders S.2
 1913 Flanders F.5
 1913 Floryanski Biplane
 1913 Foehn Eindecker
 1913 Fokker W2 seaplane
 1913 Forlanini F.2 airship
 1913 Fournier Monoplane
 1913 Franchault Monoplane
 1913 Frantisek Novak No.1 helicopter
 1913 Frantisek Novak No.2 helicopter
 1913 Gabardini monoplane
 1913 Gage-McClay Tractor biplane
 1913 Galvin Seaplane
 1913 Garuda Eindecker
 1913 Gallaudet Monoplane flying boat
 1913 Gnosspelius Hydrobiplane
 1913 Gotha LD2 doppeldecker
 1913 Gotha LE2 doppeldecker
 1913 Gotha Eindecker
 1913 Goupy A biplane
 1913 Goupy B biplane
 1913 Goupy Hydrobiplane
 1913 Grahame-White Monoplane
 1913 Grahame-White VI 2 seater military biplane
 1913 Grahame-White VII Popular
 1913 Grahame-White VIII hydrobiplane
 1913 Grahame-White X Charabanc biplane
 1913 Gramaticescu No.1 monoplane
 1913 Grigorovich Schetinin M-3 flying boat (also known as Sch-3)
 1913 Guillaume Push-pull biplane
 1913 Handley Page G biplane
 1913 Hayabusa Biplane
 1913 Hayot Tandem monoplane
 1913 Heath 2B flying boat
 1913 Heinrich D monoplane
 1913 Henkel-Albatros Taube
 1913 Huet-Grazzioli-Lombardini Monoplane
 1913 Iordan Biplane
 1913 Jannus Flying boat
 1913 Japanese Army Mo biplane
 1913 Jatho Seaplane
 1913 Jeannin Stahltaube
 1913 Jeanson-Colliex Giant floatplane
 1913 Kahnt Falke
 1913 Kaishiki No.3 biplane
 1913 Kaishiki No.4 biplane
 1913 Kaishiki No.5 biplane
 1913 Kaishiki No.6 biplane
 1913 Kalep-Dybovski Monoplane
 1913 Karpeka 3 biplane
 1913 Kasyanenko 4 monoplane
 1913 Knabel Monoplane
 1913 Kondor Taube
 1913 Kovanko AA pusher monoplane
 1913 Kvasz V
 1913 Kvasz VI monoplane
 1913 Laird No.2 baby biplane
 1913 Lakes Hydromonoplane
 1913 Lazard Parasol monoplane
 1913 Lazarus I monoplane
 1913 Lecomte Monoplane
 1913 Lecoq-Monteiro-Aillaud 4bis monoplane
 1913 Lee-Richards annular monoplane
 1913 Lelieve Monoplane
 1913 Letai V 2 seater monoplane
 1913 Leveque-Salmson Biplane
 1913 Lillie Tractor biplane
 1913 Lohner E17 flying boat
 1913 Lohner-Etrich E-1 racing eindecker
 1913 Lohner-Etrich-Mickl-Paulal M flying boat
 1913 Lohner Pfeilflieger AD355 racing 2 seater doppeldecker
 1913 Loughead G flying boat
 1913 LVG Eindecker
 1913 Marine Flying boat
 1913 Martin Hydrobiplane
 1913 Martin T and TT tractor biplane
 1913 Martin-Handasyde No.6
 1913 Martin-Handasyde No.7
 1913 Martinsyde S-1 biplane
 1913 Morane-Saulnier Demoiselle monoplane
 1913 Morane-Saulnier Type L Parasol monoplane
 1913 Morane-Saulnier Type M 1 seater monoplane
 1913 Nakajima FU
 1913 Nieuport Pusher sesquiplane seaplane
 1913 Nieuport VI.H tandem monoplane seaplane
 1913 Nieuport X 2 seater monoplane
 1913 Nieuport XI 1 seater monoplane
 1913 Nieuport-Dunne flying wing
 1913 Otto Militartyp doppeldecker
 1913 Otto Eindecker
 1913 Parseval PL-8 airship
 1913 Parseval PL-9 airship
 1913 Parseval PL-10 airship
 1913 Parseval PL-12 airship
 1913 Parseval PL-13 airship
 1913 Parseval PL-14 airship
 1913 Parseval PL-16 P-IV airship
 1913 Parseval PL-17 airship
 1913 Parseval PL-18 airship
 1913 Parsons Biplane
 1913 Partridge-Keller No.1 biplane
 1913 Partridge-Keller Trainer biplane
 1913 Paterson No.2bis seabiplane
 1913 Patterson-Francis Twin tractor flying boat
 1913 Pega Emich Eindecker
 1913 Perry Bradle T1 biplane
 1913 Philippon Tandem monoplane
 1913 Pippart-Noll PN3 eindecker
 1913 Placek Multiplane
 1913 Ponche-Primaud Tubavion
 1913 Ponnier D.III monoplane
 1913 Ponnier Cavalrie
 1913 Prodam III 2 seater military monoplane
 1913 R.A.A. Kostevich airship
 1913 Radley-England waterplane No.1
 1913 Radley-England waterplane No.2
 1913 Ratmanoff Tandem monoplane 2 seater
 1913 Royal Aircraft Factory B.E.7
 1913 Royal Aircraft Factory B.E.8
 1913 Royal Aircraft Factory B.S.1
 1913 Royal Aircraft Factory H.R.E.2
 1913 Royal Aircraft Factory R.E.1
 1913 Royal Aircraft Factory R.E.2
 1913 Royal Aircraft Factory S.E.2
 1913 Riggs-Wehr Biplane
 1913 Riggs-Wehr Tractor biplane
 1913 Robinson Monoplane
 1913 Robiola Idromultiplano
 1913 Roland Doppeltaube
 1913 Rosto Monoplane
 1913 Rozental Monoplane
 1913 Rudlicki R-1
 1913 Rumpler Eindecker
 1913 Sandford-Miller Biplane
 1913 Schelies Hydromonoplane
 1913 Schio Italia II airship
 1913 Schmitt No.7 biplane
 1913 Schwade Doppeldecker 2 seater
 1913 Shiukov Canard 1bis and 2
 1913 Short S.60 tractor biplane
 1913 Short S.63 tractor seaplane
 1913 Short S.68 tractor seaplane
 1913 Short S.80 Nile pusher floatplane
 1913 Short S.81 pusher floatplane
 1913 SIA R2 biplane
 1913 Sikorsky Grand 2 engined tractor biplane
 1913 Sikorsky S-9 Kruglyi monocoque
 1913 Sikorsky S-10 and S-10A seaplane
 1913 Sikorsky S-11 Pulukrugliy monoplane
 1913 Sikorsky S-21 Russky Vityaz 4 engined biplane with enclosed flight deck
 1913 Sikorsky S-22 Ilya Mourometz 4 engined biplane with enclosed flight deck
 1913 Smurov Ornithopter
 1913 Sonora Biplane
 1913 Sopwith Bat boat BB1, BB2 and BB3
 1913 Sopwith D biplane
 1913 Sopwith DM tractor biplane
 1913 Sopwith HT biplane
 1913 Sopwith St. B tractor
 1913 Sopwith Tabloid floatplane
 1913 Suranyi II monoplane
 1913 Sutro Twin tractor hydroaeroplane
 1913 Svachulay Albatrosz IV
 1913 Svachulay Albatrosz V
 1913 Svachulay Hummingbird IV
 1913 Svechnikov 2
 1913 Szekely IV 2 seater parasol monoplane
 1913 Szekely VI Bubu monoplane
 1913 Takasou No.3 biplane
 1913 Takasou No.4 biplane
 1913 Tereschenko 5bis monoplane
 1913 Tereschenko Pischoff 5 monoplane
 1913 Thomas Hydro flying boat
 1913 Thomas Nacelle pusher biplane
 1913 Thomas Special E biplane
 1913 Tonini-Bergonzi-Negri TBN Italia 2
 1913 Toth IV monoplane
 1913 Toth V monoplane
 1913 Trebeudin Biplane
 1913 Tsuzuku Monoplane No.3
 1913 Union Floatplane
 1913 Union Pfeil doppeldecker
 1913 Van Meel Brisk Biplane
 1913 Vickers EFB.2 18 and 18A biplane
 1913 Vickers No.7 monoplane
 1913 Vickers No.8 monoplane
 1913 Vickers No.26 Pumpkin biplane
 1913 Vlaicu III
 1913 Voisin 13.5 meters pusher biplane
 1913 Voisin Hydravion
 1913 Voisin L biplane
 1913 Voisin Petit Blinde biplane
 1913 Watson No.3 biplane
 1913 Wenskus Eindecker
 1913 Westlake Monoplane
 1913 White and Thompson No.1 biplane
 1913 White and Thompson No.2
 1913 Wight No.1 seaplane
 1913 Wight No.2 Navy plane
 1913 Williams Tractor headless biplane
 1913 Willows No.5 airship
 1913 Wizina Hummingbird
 1913 Wong Biplane
 1913 WPS Eindecker
 1913 Wright Model CH
 1913 Wright Model E
 1913 Wright Model F
 1913 Wright Model G
 1913 Wright Model G Aeroboat
 1913 Wroblewski II 2 seater military armoured monoplane
 1913 Wullschleger-Peier Triplane (Fritz Wullschleger and Albert Peier)
 1913 Yamada No.4 airship
 1913 Zahradnicek Monoplane
 1913 Zeppelin LZ-17 airship
 1913 Zeppelin LZ-18 L-2 airship
 1913 Zodiac No.12 airship
 1913 Zodiac Spiess No.13 and No.13A airship
 1913 Zodiac No.14 airship
 1913 Zodiac No.15 airship
 1913 Zodiac No.16 airship
 1913 Zselyi Eindecker II

Bleriot XI

 Blériot XI Artillerie
 Blériot XI Ecole
 Blériot XI Militaire
 Blériot XI R1
 Blériot XI REP
 Blériot XIbis
 Blériot XI-2 Artillerie
 Blériot XI-2 BG
 Blériot XI-2 Genie
 Blériot XI-2 Hauteur
 Blériot XI-2bis
 Blériot XI-3 Concours Militaire 3 seater

Etrich Taube

 Albatros Taube (Produced by the Albatros Flugzeugwerke)
 Albatros Doppeltaube (Biplane version produced by the Albatros Flugzeugwerke)
 Aviatik Taube (Produced by the Automobil und Aviatik AG firm)
 DFW Stahltaube (Version with a steel frame)
 EFW Etrich Taube (Produced by the inventor Igo Etrich and EFW Etrich Flugzeugwerke)
 EFW Etrich II Taube 2-seater tractor monoplane
 EFW Etrich II modified Taube tractor monoplane
 EFW Etrich III Möve (Seagull) tractor monoplane
 EFW Etrich IV Manövertaube Type B military 2-seater monoplane
 EFW Etrich IV Taube tractor monoplane
 EFW Etrich V Taube tractor monoplane
 EFW Etrich VI Taube tractor monoplane
 EFW Etrich VII Renntaube 3-seater racing monoplane
 EFW Etrich VIII Luft-Limousine 4-seater high-wing monoplane
 EFW Etrich IX Schwalbe monoplane
 EFW Etrich XII Rennapparat 2-seater bomber monoplane
 EFW Etrich Taube Type 1913 2-seater bomber monoplane
 EFW Etrich Manövertaube Type F 2-seater military monoplane
 EFW Etrich Etrichapparat monoplane
 Etrich-Rumpler Taube (Initial name of the Rumpler Taube)
 Gotha Taube (Produced by the Gothaer Waggonfabrik as the LE1, LE2 and LE3 (land eindecker means land monoplane) and designated A.I by the Idflieg)
 Harlan Pfeil Taube
 Halberstadt Taube III (Produced by the Halberstadt)
 Jeannin Taube (Jeannin Stahltaube version with a steel tubing fuselage structure)
 Kondor Taube (Produced by the Kondor)
 RFG Taube (Produced by the Reise und Industrieflug GmbH (RFG))
 Roland Taube
 Rumpler Taube (Produced by Rumpler Luftfahrzeugbau)
 Rumpler Delfin-Taube (Rumpler Kabinentaube Delfin version with a closed cabin, produced by Rumpler Luftfahrzeugbau)

References

Bibliography

Further reading

External links

 pre-1914